Pipunculus fonsecai is a species of fly in the family Pipunculidae.

Distribution
Belgium, Great Britain, Germany, Hungary, Italy, Latvia, Norway, Slovakia, Sweden, Netherlands.

References

Pipunculidae
Insects described in 1966
Diptera of Europe